Nigel Robert Merrett (born 1940) is a British zoologist and ichthyologist and former director of the fish section of the British Natural History Museum.

In 1998, Merrett participated in an expedition headed by Nikolas Vasilyevich Parin to collect deepwater specimens.

Book
In 1997, Merrett, along with R.L. Haedrich, wrote the book Deep-Sea Demersal Fish and Fisheries. In the book, they warn against fishing in deep water.

Taxon described by him
See :Category:Taxa named by Nigel Merrett

Taxon named in his honor 
Merret's snailfish (Careproctus merretti), also called the snakehead snailfish is named after him.
The eel Ilyophis nigeli. The species epithet "nigeli" was given in honour of Merrett, who was credited with making "substantial contributions" to the knowledge of the synaphobranchid eels.

References

External links
Select publications by Nigel R. Merrett

British ichthyologists
Living people
1940 births